Robert Steere (1833–1910) was a latter 19th century pioneer in California, nine years after U.S. statehood. He was a member of the Los Angeles Common Council, the legislative branch of the city government.

Personal
Steere was born in New York State in 1833 and moved to St. Paul, Minnesota, thence to Sioux City, Iowa, and Omaha, Nebraska. He set out with a party of seven across the Great Plains and arrived in California in 1859. From there he went to Placerville and then to El Dorado. He married Anne Higgins there in 1864.

He returned to New York for even years, then came back to California, finally settling in Los Angeles, California.

He died April 29, 1910, in his home at 226 South Olive Street in Los Angeles. Interment was at Calvary Cemetery, East Los Angeles.

Vocation

Steere purchased a business in El Dorado, where he also was postmaster and agent for Wells Fargo & Company.

Public service

In December 1881, Steere was elected to represent the 3rd Ward on the Los Angeles Common Council, the legislative branch of the city government, where he served two consecutive one-year terms, ending December 6, 1883.

References and notes
Access to the Los Angeles Times links may require the use of a library card.

Los Angeles Common Council (1850–1889) members
19th-century American politicians
1833 births
1910 deaths
Burials at Calvary Cemetery (Los Angeles)